The British Consul General to Jerusalem is based at 15 Nashashibi Street in Sheikh Jarrah quarter, Jerusalem. The aim of the Consulate General is to represent the United Kingdom in the Palestinian Territories. The Consulate also has an office in Gaza.

List of Consuls-General
1839–1845: William Tanner Young
1846–1863: James Finn
1863–1890: Noel Temple Moore
1890–1906: John Dickson
1906–1909: Edward C. Blech
1909–1912: Peter J.C. McGregor

There was no Consul-General during World War I since the UK was an enemy of the Ottoman Empire.  After the war and until 1948, Palestine was a British mandate territory, with District Commissioners.

1948–1951: Sir Hugh Dow
1951–1953: Herbert R. Gybbon-Monypenny
1957–1959: Andrew C. Stewart
1959–1962: James M. Walsh
1962–1964: Alastair G. Maitland
1964–1967: Hubert N. Pullar
1967–1970: John H. Lewen
1970–1974: John M. O. Snodgrass
1974–1976: Edward E. Key
1976–1980: Michael P.V. Hannam
1980–1984: Donald A. Hamley
1984–1987: Patrick G. de Courcy-Ireland
1987–1990: Ivan R. Callan
1990–1993: David R. MacLennan
1993–1997: Richard J. Dalton
1997–2001: Robin A. Kealy
2001–2003: Geoffrey Adams
2003–2006: Dr. John Jenkins
2007–2010: Richard Makepeace
2010–2013: Sir Vincent Fean
2014–2017: Alastair McPhail

2017–: Philip Hall
Diane Corner, since July 14, 2021.

References

External links
UK and The Occupied Palestinian Territories, gov.uk

Jerusalem
 
Consuls United Kingdom
United kingdom